Loyalakpa, also spelt as Loyarakpa, is a God in Meitei mythology and religion of Ancient Kangleipak (Antique Manipur). He is best known for wrestling with Khoriphaba during the Lai Haraoba festival. He is the consort of goddess Thoudu Nungthel Leima. He is one of the ten kingly gods (or ten divine kings) in Meitei religion.

Description 
Among the deities, God Loyalakpa and God Khoriphaba possess the epithets of being the best wrestlers. The two powerful gods wrestled during the Lai Haraoba festival.

Mythology 
When the divine polo match was played among the gods, Loyalakpa participated in the southern team. His team was led by God Thangjing while his opponent's team (northern team) was led by God Marjing.

Cults and shrines 
The main deities assembled in the Lai Haraoba of the Phayeng are almost similar to those of the Sekmai. God Loyalakpa is one of these deities.
God Loyalakpa and other deities including Panam Ningthou, Pureiromba and Koubru hold the special position of the Chakpa Haraoba (one of the 4 types of Lai Haraoba festival).

Namesakes

Mountain peak 
Loyalakpa is one of the four sacred mountain peaks of the Meitei people. The others are Koubru, Kounu and Thangjing. These names of the peaks are named after the respective presiding gods.

Related pages 
 Koupalu (Koubru) - Northwest protector
 Marjing - Northeast protector
 Thangjing - Southwest protector
 Wangbren - Southeast protector

References

External links 

Abundance deities
Abundance gods
Earth deities
Earth gods
Fortune deities
Fortune gods
Guardians of the directions
Kings in Meitei mythology
Love and lust deities
Love and lust gods
Magic deities
Magic gods
Maintenance deities
Maintenance gods
Meitei deities
Mountain deities
Mountain gods
Names of God in Sanamahism
Nature deities
Nature gods
Ningthou
Peace deities
Peace gods
Rain deities
Sky and weather deities
Sky and weather gods
Sports deities
Sports gods
Time and fate deities
Time and fate gods
Wind deities
Wind gods